Gomphichis is a genus of flowering plants from the orchid family, Orchidaceae, native to Costa Rica and northern South America.

Species:

Gomphichis adnata (Ridl.) Schltr.
Gomphichis alba F.Lehm. & Kraenzl.
Gomphichis altissima Renz
Gomphichis bogotensis Renz
Gomphichis brachystachys Schltr.
Gomphichis caucana Schltr.
Gomphichis cladotricha Renz
Gomphichis crassilabia Garay
Gomphichis cundinamarcae Renz
Gomphichis goodyeroides Lindl.
Gomphichis gracilis Schltr.
Gomphichis hetaerioides Schltr.
Gomphichis koehleri Schltr.
Gomphichis lancipetala Schltr.
Gomphichis longifolia (Rolfe) Schltr.
Gomphichis longiscapa (Kraenzl.) Schltr.
Gomphichis macbridei C.Schweinf.
Gomphichis plantaginea Schltr.
Gomphichis plantaginifolia C.Schweinf.
Gomphichis scaposa Schltr.
Gomphichis steyermarkii Foldats
Gomphichis traceyae Rolfe
Gomphichis valida Rchb.f
Gomphichis viscosa (Rchb.f.) Schltr.

References 

  (1840) The Genera and Species of Orchidaceous Plants 446.
  (2003) Genera Orchidacearum 3: 37 ff. Oxford University Press.
  2005. Handbuch der Orchideen-Namen. Dictionary of Orchid Names. Dizionario dei nomi delle orchidee. Ulmer, Stuttgart

External links 

Cranichideae genera
Cranichidinae